Pascucci may refer to:

Pascucci (surname)
Caffè Pascucci